Macrocosm is the seventh studio album by the German electronic composer Peter Frohmader, released in 1990 by Cuneiform Records.

Track listing

Personnel 
Adapted from the Macrocosm liner notes.
Peter Frohmader – instruments, cover art
Paula Millet – design
Roger Seibel – mastering

Release history

References

External links 
 Macrocosm at Discogs (list of releases)
 Macrocosm at Bandcamp

1990 albums
Cuneiform Records albums
Peter Frohmader albums